Victor Herbert Seipke (born 23 April 1932) is an American bodybuilder.  His titles include Mr. Michigan (1951), Junior Mr. America (1955) and Mr. America-Masters (1976).

Seipke worked as a fireman in Michigan.

References

External links
Vic Seipke at Classic Bodybuilders

1932 births
Living people
American bodybuilders
People associated with physical culture
Professional bodybuilders